The Fencing at the 2013 World Combat Games  held  in St. Petersburg, Russia from 24–26 October.

Medalists

Athletes list

 Hugues Boisvert-Simard 
 Nikolai Novosjolov 
 Iván Trevejo 
 Ulrich Robeiri 
 Gábor Boczkó 
 Elmir Alimzhanov 
 Song Jae-ho 
 Khaled Buhdeima 
 Radosław Zawrotniak 
 Pavel Sukhov 
 Anton Avdeev 
 Max Heinzer 
 Fabian Kauter 
 Bohdan Nikishyn 
 Silvio Fernández 
 Ruben Limardo

Results

References
  schedule Combat

Fencing at the 2013 World Combat Games